The Romanian Episcopal Conference (Romanian: Conferinţa Episcopală Română) is the permanent assembly of Catholic bishops in Romania. The bishops' conference has its headquarters in Bucharest, is a member of the Council of European Episcopal Conferences (CCEE) and sends a representative to the Commission of the Bishops' Conferences of the European Community (COMECE).  

The President of the Romanian Episcopal Conference is Archbishop Lucian Mureşan, head of the Romanian Church United with Rome. 

Notable members are:

Aurel Percă, Archbishop and Metropolitan of Bucharest

György Jakubinyi, Roman Catholic Archbishop of Alba Iulia 
and Apostolic Administrator of the Armenians in Romania

The other bishops (diocesan bishops, auxiliary bishops and retired bishops) represent the Latin and Romanian rites.

Chairman

Áron Márton, Archbishop of Alba Iulia (1970-1980)

Cardinal Alexandru Todea, Archbishop of Fagaras and Alba Iulia (1991-1994)

Ioan Robu, Archbishop of Bucharest (1994-1998)

Lucian Mureşan, Major Archbishop of Alba Iulia (1998-2001)

Ioan Robu, Archbishop of Bucharest (2001-2004)

Lucian Mureşan, Major Archbishop of Alba Iulia (2004-2007)

Ioan Robu, Archbishop of Bucharest (2007-2010)

Lucian Mureşan, Cardinal, Major Archbishop of Fagaras and Alba Iulia (2010-2013)

Ioan Robu, Archbishop of Bucharest (2013-2016)

Lucian Mureşan, Cardinal, Major Archbishop of Fagaras and Alba Iulia (since 2016)

See also
Catholic Church in Romania

References

External links
 http://www.bisericacatolica.ro - official site
 http://www.gcatholic.org/dioceses/conference/089.htm
 http://www.catholica.ro/

Romania
Catholic Church in Romania